Eduard Augustin (born 10 September 1942) is an East German sprint canoer who competed in the early 1970s. He won a silver medal in the K-4 1000 m event at the 1970 ICF Canoe Sprint World Championships in Copenhagen.

Augustin was a reserve for the East German team at the 1968 Summer Olympics but he did not compete. Augustin competed in the K-4 1000 m event at the 1972 Summer Olympics in Munich, but was eliminated in the semifinals.

References

1942 births
Canoeists at the 1972 Summer Olympics
German male canoeists
Living people
Olympic canoeists of East Germany
ICF Canoe Sprint World Championships medalists in kayak